The Belgian railway line 15 is a railway line in Belgium connecting Antwerp with Hasselt. It was opened between 1855 and 1925. The total length of the line between the Drabstraat junction (between Berchem and Mortsel) and the Zonhoven junction (north of Hasselt) is 92.1 km. Line 15 is not the shortest or fastest connection between Antwerp and Hasselt: the faster trains take the 14 km shorter route through Lier, Aarschot and Diest (lines 16 and 35).

Stations
The main interchange stations on line 15 are:

Antwerpen-Berchem: to Antwerp, Roosendaal, Ghent and Brussels 
Lier: to Mechelen and Aarschot
Herentals: to Turnhout - Line 29
Mol: to Neerpelt - Line 19
Hasselt: to Aarschot, Genk, Landen and Liège

References

15
Standard gauge railways in Belgium
Railway lines opened in 1855